The Rum layered intrusion is located in Scotland, on the island of Rùm (Inner Hebrides). It is a mass of intrusive rock, of mafic-ultramafic composition, the remains of the eroded, solidified magma chamber of an extinct volcano that was active during the Palaeogene Period. It is associated with the nearby Skye intrusion and Skye, Mull and Egg lavas. It was emplaced 60 million years ago above the Iceland hotspot.

References 

Geology of Scotland
Layered intrusions
Paleogene volcanism
Rùm